The ISRO Propulsion Complex (IPRC), located at Mahendragiri of Tamil Nadu, is an Indian Space Research Organisation (ISRO) centre involved in testing, assembling, and integrating propulsion systems and stages that are developed at ISRO's Liquid Propulsion Systems Centres. Formerly, IPRC was known as LPSC, Mahendragiri, functioning under LPSC. It was elevated as an independent centre and renamed as IPRC with effect from 1 February 2014.

The complex is situated near Panagudi in Tirunelveli District, Tamil Nadu.

It is one of the ISRO centres that could be called as the "Jet Propulsion Laboratory of India" as all liquid, cryogenic and semicryogenic stage and engine related tests of ISRO's launch vehicles and satellites are carried out here.

Facilities
Following activities are currently carried out at IPRC:
Assembly, integration and testing of launch vehicle motors and stages
Servicing of launch vehicle motors and stages
Propellant storage
Sea level and high altitude tests of Vikas, PS2/GS2, PS4, L40, L110, S200, CE-7.5 and CE-20 cryogenic engines, and steering engines
L40 and CE-7.5 development and qualification tests
Assembly and integration of flight stages PS2/GS2, PS4, L40 for PSLV and GSLV missions
Assembly and integration of LAM engine and AOCS thruster for satellites

See also
Indian Space Research Organisation
Liquid Propulsion Systems Centre
Vikram Sarabhai Space Centre
Satish Dhawan Space Centre
Indian Institute of Space Science and Technology

References

Space programme of India
Space technology research institutes
Research institutes in Tamil Nadu
2014 establishments in Tamil Nadu
Research institutes established in 2014
Tirunelveli district